The following is a list of notable deaths in December 2020.

Entries for each day are listed alphabetically by surname. A typical entry lists information in the following sequence:
 Name, age, country of citizenship at birth, subsequent country of citizenship (if applicable), reason for notability, cause of death (if known), and reference.

December 2020

1
Loris Abate, 92, Italian jewelry designer.
Norman Abramson, 88, American engineer and computer scientist, developer of ALOHAnet, skin cancer.
Faustino Amiano, 76, Spanish Olympic coxswain (1960).
G. Ross Anderson, 91, American jurist, judge of the U.S. District Court for South Carolina (1980–2009).
Hasna Begum, 85, Bangladeshi philosopher and feminist, COVID-19. 
June Rose Bellamy, 88, Burmese aristocrat and socialite, first lady (1976–1977).
Abhay Bharadwaj, 66, Indian politician, MP (since 2020), COVID-19.
Keith Buckley, 79, English actor (Dr. Phibes Rises Again, The Eagle Has Landed, Sky Bandits).
Russell Catley, 47, English cricketer (Suffolk).
Jean Cottard, 94, French fencer and fencing master.
Eric Engstrom, 55, American software engineer (DirectX).
Todd Gibson, 83, American racing driver.
Judy Gordon, 72, Canadian politician, member of the Legislative Assembly of Alberta (1993–2004).
Luciano Guerzoni, 82, Italian politician, deputy (1983–1992, 1994–1996).
Juan Hormaechea, 81, Spanish politician, president of Cantabria (1987–1990, 1991–1995) and mayor of Santander (1977–1987).
Maria Itkina, 88, Russian Olympic runner (1956, 1960, 1964).
Nina Ivanova, 86, Russian actress (Once There Was a Girl, Spring on Zarechnaya Street, There Is Such a Lad).
Brian Kerr, Baron Kerr of Tonaghmore, 72, British jurist, lord chief justice of Northern Ireland (2004–2009) and justice of the Supreme Court of the United Kingdom (2009–2020).
Mana Kinjo, 24, Japanese actress (Kishiryu Sentai Ryusoulger).
Jean-Pierre Lola Kisanga, 51, Congolese politician.
Paul Kishindo, 68, Malawian sociologist.
Frank Kramer, 73, Dutch footballer (FC Volendam, Telstar), television presenter and football commentator.
Li Guanxing, 80, Chinese nuclear material engineer, member of the Chinese Academy of Engineering.
Eduardo Lourenço, 97, Portuguese philosopher and writer.
Mohammad Maleki, 87, Iranian academic, chancellor of the University of Tehran (1979).
Denis Menke, 80, American baseball player (Milwaukee / Atlanta Braves, Houston Astros, Cincinnati Reds).
Leonardo Fernandes Moreira, 46, Brazilian politician, Minas Gerais MLA (2003–2011), heart attack.
Nomula Narsimhaiah, 64, Indian politician, Telangana MLA (since 2018), complications from COVID-19.
Timoteo Ofrasio, 72, Filipino Jesuit priest and liturgist, COVID-19.
Thelma Pepper, 100, Canadian artist.
Thomas Morrow Reavley, 99, American politician and jurist, secretary of state of Texas (1955–1957) and judge of the U.S. Court of Appeals for the Fifth Circuit (since 1979).
Arnie Robinson, 72, American athlete, Olympic champion (1976), COVID-19.
Erlend Rian, 79, Norwegian politician, mayor of Tromsø (1980–1995).
Alan Sanchez, 32, American soccer player (Real Maryland, Charlotte Eagles).
Tommy Sandt, 69, American baseball player (Oakland Athletics) and coach (Pittsburgh Pirates).
Kelvin Scarborough, 56, American basketball player (New Mexico Lobos).
Joseph Sledge, 76, American wrongly imprisoned prisoner.
Hanna Stadnik, 91, Polish World War II combatant (Warsaw Uprising), acting president of World Association of Home Army Soldiers (since 2020).
Henri Teissier, 91, French-Algerian Roman Catholic prelate, archbishop of Algiers (1988–2008), stroke.
Sol Tolchinsky, 91, Canadian Olympic basketball player (1948), complications of COVID-19.
Raymond Wolters, 82, American historian.

2
Mohamed Abarhoun, 31, Moroccan footballer (Moghreb Tétouan, Moreirense, national team), stomach cancer.
Jean René Allard, 90, Canadian politician, member of the Manitoba Legislature (1969–1973).
Warren Berlinger, 83, American actor (The Joey Bishop Show, The Cannonball Run, The World According to Garp), cancer.
Frank Carney, 82, American entrepreneur, co-founder of Pizza Hut, pneumonia.
Richard Corben, 80, American illustrator and comic book artist, complications from heart surgery.
Bronisław Dankowski, 76, Polish politician and trade union activist, member of the Sejm (1997–2005).
Koba Davitashvili, 49, Georgian politician, MP (1999–2016), ankylosing spondylitis.
Franco Giraldi, 89, Italian film director (Seven Guns for the MacGregors, Sugar Colt, Up the MacGregors!) and screenwriter, COVID-19.
Valéry Giscard d'Estaing, 94, French politician, president of France and co-prince of Andorra (1974–1981), minister of the economy and finance (1962–1966, 1969–1974), complications from COVID-19.
Satpal Gosain, 85, Indian politician, Punjab MLA (1997–2012).
Kazuo Hiramatsu, 73, Japanese accountant, president of the Kwansei Gakuin University (2002–2008).
Zafarullah Khan Jamali, 76, Pakistani politician, prime minister (2002–2004) and chief minister of Balochistan (1988, 1996–1997), heart attack.
Rafer Johnson, 86, American athlete and actor (The Sins of Rachel Cade, None but the Brave, Licence to Kill), Olympic champion (1960), complications from a stroke.
Kenneth V. Jones, 96, British composer, conductor and music teacher.
Hugh Keays-Byrne, 73, English-Australian actor (Mad Max: Fury Road, Stone, Farscape).
Sergey Kiselnikov, 62, Russian footballer (Dynamo Vologda, Amur Blagoveshchensk).
Alanna Knight, 97, British writer.
Alfred Kucharczyk, 83, Polish Olympic gymnast (1960, 1964), COVID-19.
David C. Lewis, 85, American medical researcher.
Karin Lindberg, 91, Swedish gymnast, Olympic champion (1952).
Enrique Lingenfelder, 92, Argentine Olympic rower (1948).
Geoffrey Massey, 96, Canadian architect, pneumonia.
Aldo Moser, 86, Italian racing cyclist, COVID-19.
Pat Patterson, 79, Canadian-American Hall of Fame professional wrestler (BTW, AWA) and producer (WWF), liver failure.
Boris Plotnikov, 71, Russian actor (The Ascent, The Cold Summer of 1953, Heart of a Dog), COVID-19.
Karim Salman, 55, Iraqi Olympic footballer (1988), COVID-19.
David Sheehan, 82, American reporter, prostate cancer.
Bill Spanswick, 82, American baseball player (Boston Red Sox).
Lalit Surjan, 74, Indian journalist and editor (Deshbandhu), stroke.
Pamela Tiffin, 78, American actress (One, Two, Three, Harper, Summer and Smoke) and model.
Bernard Vogler, 85, French historian and academic.
Walter E. Williams, 84, American economist and academic.

3
Noah Creshevsky, 75, American composer, cancer.
Fred DeBernardi, 71, American football player (Kansas City Chiefs) and discus thrower, cancer.
Bill Fitsell, 97, Canadian sports journalist and historian.
Paudie Fitzgerald, 87, Irish racing cyclist.
Maria Fyfe, 82, Scottish politician, MP (1987–2001).
André Gagnon, 84, Canadian pianist, composer and conductor, Lewy body dementia.
Dharampal Gulati, 97, Indian spice executive, CEO of MDH (since 1959), cardiac arrest.
Dadang Hawari, 80, Indonesian psychiatrist, COVID-19.
Mian Muhammad Afzal Hayat, Pakistani politician, chief minister of Punjab (1996–1997).
Steve Heimkreiter, 63, American football player (Baltimore Colts), cancer.
Bill Holmes, 94, English footballer (Blackburn Rovers, Bradford City).
Volodymyr Huba, 81, Ukrainian composer and poet.
Kaj Ikast, 84, Danish politician, MF (1993–2005), minister of transport (1990–1993).
Adil Ismayilov, 63, Azerbaijani lawyer, jurist, and investigator, COVID-19.
William King, 90, Canadian politician, member of the Legislative Assembly of British Columbia (1972–1983).
Kiptarus Arap Kirior, Kenyan politician, MP (1983–1988, 1992–1997).
Jutta Lampe, 82, German actress (Schaubühne, Marianne and Juliane, The Distant Land).
Alison Lurie, 94, American novelist (Foreign Affairs, The War Between the Tates), Pulitzer Prize winner (1984).
Mario Maraschi, 81, Italian football player (Lazio, Lanerossi Vicenza, Fiorentina) and manager.
Marv Marinovich, 81, American football player (Oakland Raiders).
Patricia Marmont, 99, American-born British actress (Helen of Troy).
Ron Mathewson, 76, Scottish jazz double bassist and bass guitarist, COVID-19.
Dronamraju Krishna Rao, 83, Indian geneticist.
Albert Salvadó, 69, Andorran writer and industrial engineer.
Scott Marshall Smith, 62, American screenwriter (Men of Honor, The Score, When the Game Stands Tall).
Bill Spencer, 84, American Olympic biathlon skier (1964, 1968).
Betsy Wade, 91, American journalist, colon cancer.
Bobby Wishart, 87, Scottish footballer (Aberdeen, Dundee, Raith Rovers).
Ian Yule, 87, British-born South African actor (Zulu Dawn, The Wild Geese, Shamwari).

4
Josette Banzet, 73, French-American actress (Rich Man, Poor Man, The Other Side of Midnight).
Franco Bolignari, 91, Italian singer.
Peter DiFronzo, 87, American mobster, complications from COVID-19.
Larry Dixon, 78, American politician, member of the Alabama Senate (1983–2011) and House of Representatives (1978–1982), COVID-19.
Ole Espersen, 85, Danish politician, minister of justice (1981–1982).
Gérard Gourgue, 95, Haitian politician, member of the National Council of Government (1986).
Cliff Green, 85, Australian screenwriter (Picnic at Hanging Rock, Break of Day, Summerfield).
Goldie Hershon, 79, Canadian civil rights activist, president of the Canadian Jewish Congress (1995–1998).
Narinder Singh Kapany, 94, Indian-American physicist.
William Kittredge, 88, American writer.
Grace Knowlton, 88, American sculptor, complications from dementia.
David Lander, 73, American actor (Laverne & Shirley, Who Framed Roger Rabbit, Will the Real Jerry Lewis Please Sit Down), complications from multiple sclerosis.
François Leterrier, 91, French film director (A King Without Distraction, Slices of Life) and actor (A Man Escaped).
Antonín J. Liehm, 96, Czech writer, publisher and translator, founder of Lettre International.
Madeleine Mathiot, 93, American linguist.
Larry Mavety, 78, Canadian ice hockey player (Los Angeles Sharks, Philadelphia Blazers) and coach (Belleville Bulls).
Jayant Meghani, 82, Indian book editor and translator.
Alexander Nikolayevich Mikhailov, 69, Russian politician, deputy (1993–2000) and governor of Kursk Oblast (2000–2018).
James Odongo, 89, Ugandan Roman Catholic prelate, archbishop of Tororo (1999–2007).
Huba Rozsnyai, 77, Hungarian Olympic sprinter (1964), COVID-19.
Bassam Saba, 61, Lebanese musician, complications from COVID-19.
Jackie Saccoccio, 56, American abstract painter, cancer.
Anatoly Samoilenko, 82, Ukrainian mathematician, director of the NASU Institute of Mathematics (since 1988).
Victor Scantlebury, 75, Ecuadorian bishop.
John Sherwood, 87, English physical chemist.
Suhaila Siddiq, 71, Afghan politician, minister of public health (2001–2004), complications from COVID-19.
Dineshwar Sharma, 66, Indian police officer, director of the Intelligence Bureau (2015–2017) and administrator of Lakshadweep (since 2019), lung disease.
Anand Singh, 72, Fijian politician, MP (1999–2006) and attorney general (1999–2000).
Kinuko Tanida, 81, Japanese volleyball player, Olympic champion (1964), brain hemorrhage.
Ferenc Tóth, 69, Hungarian politician, MP (1998–2014), COVID-19.
Weston E. Vivian, 96, American politician, member of the U.S. House of Representatives (1965–1967).
Neville Wanless, 89, English broadcaster (ITV Tyne Tees).
Ed Xiques, 81, American jazz saxophonist.

5
Peter Abbs, 78, English poet and academic.
Peter Alliss, 89, English Hall of Fame golfer and commentator, British PGA champion (1957, 1962, 1965).
Pierre Bernard, 86, French politician, deputy (1980–1993).
Mickaël Bethe-Selassié, 69, Ethiopian-born French sculptor.
Belinda Bozzoli, South African politician, MP (since 2014), cancer.
Robert Castel, 87, French actor (The Tall Blond Man with One Black Shoe, Two Men in Town, Je suis timide mais je me soigne).
Dolf de Vries, 83, Dutch actor (Turkish Delight, Soldier of Orange, Black Book).
Des Ferrow, 87, New Zealand cricketer.
John Harvey, 82, Australian racing driver, Bathurst 1000 winner (1983), lung cancer.
Paul Howard, 70, American football player (Denver Broncos).
Louis Iribarne, 80, American-born Canadian translator.
Ron Irwin, 84, Canadian politician and diplomat, minister of Indian and Northern Affairs (1993–1997), ambassador to Ireland (1998–2001), MP (1980–1984, 1993–1997).
Henryk Kukier, 90, Polish Olympic boxer (1952, 1956, 1960), COVID-19.
Anusuya Prasad Maikhuri, 59, Indian politician, Uttarakhand MLA (2002–2007, 2012–2017), complications from COVID-19.
Sherbaz Khan Mazari, 90, Pakistani politician, leader of the opposition (1975–1977).
Sakae Menda, 95, Japanese exonerated prisoner and anti-death penalty activist.
Ildikó Pécsi, 80, Hungarian actress (Tales of a Long Journey, A Strange Role, Just like Home) and politician, MP (1994–1998).
Viktor Ponedelnik, 83, Russian football player (Rostov, SKA Rostov-on-Don, Soviet Union national team) and manager.
Martin Sandoval, 56, American politician, member of the Illinois Senate (2003–2020), COVID-19.
Erode Soundar, 63, Indian film writer and director, kidney-related illness.
Xu Shousheng, 67, Chinese politician, governor of Gansu (2007–2010), governor (2010–2013) and Communist Party secretary (2013–2016) of Hunan.
Mincho Yovchev, 78, Bulgarian politician, deputy prime minister (1989–1990).
Wojciech Zabłocki, 89, Polish architect and fencer, Olympic silver (1956, 1960) and bronze (1964) medalist.
Theodore Ziolkowski, 88, American scholar.

6
Neil Armstrong, 87, Canadian Hall of Fame ice hockey linesman.
Kent R. Brown, 79, American playwright.
Jairo Castillo, 31, Dominican baseball player and scout, COVID-19.
Dejan Dabović, 76, Montenegrin water polo player, Olympic champion (1968), COVID-19.
Muslihan DS, 74, Indonesian army officer and politician, regent of North Bengkulu (2001–2006) and Rejang Lebong (1994–1999), COVID-19.
T. B. Ekanayake, 66, Sri Lankan politician, MP (since 1994).
Jaromír Kohlíček, 67, Czech politician, MP (1998–2004), MEP (2004–2014, 2016–2019).
László Kuncz, 63, Hungarian water polo player, Olympic bronze medallist (1980).
Li Ligong, 95, Chinese politician, member of the Central Committee (1982–1992), delegate to the National People's Congress (1988-1998) and CCP Party Chief of Shanxi (1983–1991).
Monu Mukhopadhyay, 90, Indian actor (Neel Akasher Neechey, Ganadevata, Ganashatru).
Soedardjat Nataatmadja, 82, Indonesian politician, MP (1997–1999), vice governor of Irian Jaya (1989–1993) and regent of Bogor (1983–1988).
Klaus Ofczarek, 81, Austrian actor (Klimt, North Face) and opera singer.
Ravi Patwardhan, 84, Indian actor (Yeshwant, Thakshak, Grahan).
Jacques Puisais, 93, French oenologist, COVID-19.
Dennis Ralston, 78, American Hall of Fame tennis player, Davis Cup winner (1963, 1972), cancer.
Džej Ramadanovski, 56, Serbian singer.
Neil Robbins, 91, Australian Olympic steeplechase runner (1956).
Paul Sarbanes, 87, American politician, member of the U.S. House of Representatives (1971–1977) and Senate (1977–2007), Chair of the Senate Banking Committee (2001–2003).
Jack Scarbath, 90, American Hall of Fame football player (Washington Redskins, Pittsburgh Steelers, Maryland Terrapins).
Paul W. Schroeder, 93, American historian.
Eugenia Tsoumani-Spentza, Greek lawyer and politician, MP (2009–2012).
Tabaré Vázquez, 80, Uruguayan politician, president (2005–2010, 2015–2020), president pro tempore of UNASUR (2015–2016) and Intendant of Montevideo (1990–1994), lung cancer.
Senta Wengraf, 96, Austrian actress (Two Times Lotte, Voices of Spring, Sissi – The Young Empress).
Ali-Asghar Zarei, 64, Iranian military officer and politician, MP (2008–2016).

7
Udyavara Madhava Acharya, 79, Indian writer and poet.
Fred Akers, 82, American football coach (Texas Longhorns, Wyoming Cowboys, Purdue Boilermakers).
Dick Allen, 78, American baseball player (Philadelphia Phillies, Los Angeles Dodgers, Chicago White Sox).
Akito Arima, 90, Japanese nuclear physicist (Interacting boson model) and politician, MP (1998–2004).
Tihomir Arsić, 63, Serbian actor (The Promising Boy, Great Transport, Battle of Kosovo).
Joseph Arvay, 71, Canadian lawyer, heart attack.
LD Beghtol, 55, American musician (Flare Acoustic Arts League, LD & the New Criticism, Moth Wranglers) and writer.
Divya Bhatnagar, 34, Indian actress (99), COVID-19.
Joselyn Cano, 29, American model, complications from cosmetic surgery.
Jean-François Charbonnier, 61, French footballer and manager (Paris Saint-Germain F.C., Paris FC).
Natalie Desselle-Reid, 53, American actress (B.A.P.S., Eve, Rodgers and Hammerstein's Cinderella), colon cancer.
Pumza Dyantyi, 72, South African politician and anti-apartheid activist, MP (since 2019) and Eastern Cape MPL (2014–2019).
Clem Eischen, 93, American Olympic middle-distance runner (1948).
Phyllis Eisenstein, 74, American science fiction author, stroke complications and COVID-19.
Eduardo Galvão, 58, Brazilian actor (Porto dos Milagres, O Beijo do Vampiro, Bom Sucesso), COVID-19.
Aleksandr Gordon, 88, Russian film director and actor (The Killers, There Will Be No Leave Today).
İrfan Gürpınar, 77, Turkish politician, minister of tourism (1995, 1995–1996), COVID-19.
Sheila A. Hellstrom, 85, Canadian military officer.
Walter Hooper, 89, American literary editor, complications from COVID-19.
Zar Wali Khan, 67, Pakistani Islamic scholar.
Masao Komatsu, 78, Japanese actor (Kaiju funsen–Daigoro tai Goriasu, Pink Lady no Katsudō Daishashin, Izakaya Chōji) and comedian, liver cancer.
Katarzyna Łaniewska, 87, Polish actress (Nikodem Dyzma, Klan) and political activist.
Marilyn Lewis, 89, American politician, member of the Pennsylvania House of Representatives (1979–1982).
Dawn Lindberg, 75, South African folk singer, actress and theatre producer, COVID-19.
Mrigendra Nath Maiti, 77, Indian politician, West Bengal MLA (since 2011).
Sean Malone, 50, American progressive metal bassist (Cynic, Gordian Knot, Aghora).
Lidia Menapace, 96, Italian partisan and politician, senator (2006–2008), COVID-19.
Roger Moret, 71, Puerto Rican baseball player (Boston Red Sox, Atlanta Braves, Texas Rangers), cancer.
Vadim Petrov, 88, Czech composer and pianist.
Joseph Sanda, 35, Cameroonian racing cyclist.
Janusz Sanocki, 66, Polish politician and journalist, mayor of Nysa (1998–2001), deputy (2015–2019), COVID-19.
Doug Scott, 79, English mountaineer and philanthropist, cerebral lymphoma.
Malcolm Simpson, 87, New Zealand Olympic cyclist (1952).
Ildegarda Taffra, 86, Italian Olympic cross-country skier (1952, 1956), COVID-19.
Tasiman, Indonesian politician, regent of Pati (2001–2011), COVID-19.
Howard Wales, 77, American keyboardist ("Truckin'"), cerebral hemorrhage.
Gary Wisener, 82, American football player (Dallas Cowboys, Houston Oilers).
Chuck Yeager, 97, American Hall of Fame pilot, first person to exceed the speed of sound.

8
Phil Albert, 76, American football coach (Towson Tigers), cancer.
Arthur, Ecuadorian stray dog.
Gladys Beckwith, 91, American academic and women's rights activist, COVID-19.
Harold Budd, 84, American avant-garde composer and poet, complications from COVID-19.
John Cash, 84, Scottish physician, president of the Royal College of Physicians of Edinburgh (1994–1997).
Lay Nam Chang, 77, American theoretical physicist, COVID-19.
Tony Curcillo, 89, American football player (Ohio State Buckeyes, Chicago Cardinals, Hamilton Tiger Cats), complications from COVID-19.
Aslanbek Fidarov, 47, Ukrainian Olympic wrestler (1996), COVID-19.
Johnny Jacobsen, 65, Danish footballer (Fremad Amager, Feyenoord, national team).
Goo Kennedy, 71, American basketball player (San Antonio Spurs, Spirits of St. Louis, Houston Rockets).
Sidney Knott, 87, South African cricketer (Border).
Walter Lechner, 71, Austrian racing driver.
Tom Louderback, 87, American football player (Philadelphia Eagles, Oakland Raiders, Buffalo Bills).
Jordi Nadal, 91, Spanish historian and economist.
Klaus Pagh, 85, Danish actor (Soldaterkammerater rykker ud, Sunstroke at the Beach Resort, Me and the Mafia).
Shankar Painter, 74, Indian poet.
Raffaele Pinto, 75, Italian rally driver, European Rally champion (1972).
Alejandro Sabella, 66, Argentine football player (River Plate, Estudiantes) and manager (national team), heart failure.
Yevgeny Shaposhnikov, 78, Russian military officer, minister of defence (1991–1992), commander-in-chief of the Air Force (1990–1991) and secretary of the SCRF (1993), COVID-19.
Anthony Veasna So, 28, Cambodian-American writer.
Kurt Stettler, 88, Swiss footballer (FC Basel, Young Fellows Zürich, national team), COVID-19.
Gerard Stokes, 65, New Zealand rugby league player (Workington Town, national team) and coach (Canterbury Bulls), brain cancer. 
Sudjati, 66, Indonesian politician, regent of Bulungan (since 2016), COVID-19.
Graeme Tarr, 84, New Zealand cricketer.
Siraj Kassam Teli, 67, Pakistani industrialist, pneumonia.
Allen Trovillion, 94, American politician.
Roberto Ulloa, 96, Argentine politician and naval officer, governor of Salta Province (1977–1983, 1991–1995).
Ralph K. Winter Jr., 85, American jurist, judge (since 1981) and chief judge (1997–2000) of the U.S. Court of Appeals for the Second Circuit.
Wang Yupu, 64, Chinese oil executive and politician, minister of emergency management (since 2018), chairman of Sinopec (2015–2017) and member of the CAE, cancer.

9
Christopher Campling, 95, British Anglican priest, dean of Ripon (1984–1995).
V. J. Chitra, 28, Indian actress (Mannan Magal, Chinna Papa Periya Papa, Darling Darling), suicide.
Osvaldo Cochrane Filho, 87, Brazilian Olympic water polo player (1964), COVID-19.
Manglesh Dabral, 72, Indian poet, complications from COVID-19.
Nabil Farouk, 64, Egyptian novelist (Ragol Al Mostaheel, Malaf Al Mostakbal, Cocktail 2000), heart attack.
Gordon Forbes, 86, South African tennis player, COVID-19.
Dick Hinch, 71, American politician, member (since 2008) and speaker (since 2020) of the New Hampshire House of Representatives, COVID-19.
Raymond Hunter, 86, Northern Irish cricketer (all-Ireland national team) and rugby union player (all-Ireland national team).
Alan Igbon, 68, British actor (Boys from the Blackstuff, The Professionals, Coronation Street).
Vyacheslav Kebich, 84, Belarusian politician, prime minister (1991–1994), COVID-19.
Phil Linz, 81, American baseball player (New York Yankees, Philadelphia Phillies, New York Mets).
Mungo Wentworth MacCallum, 78, Australian political journalist and commentator.
John J. McNichols, 93, American politician.
Marc Meneau, 77, French chef.
Brian H. Murdoch, 90, English-born Irish mathematician.
Alex Olmedo, 84, Peruvian-American Hall of Fame tennis player.
Ray Perkins, 79, American football player (Baltimore Colts) and coach (New York Giants, Tampa Bay Buccaneers), heart disease.
Paolo Rossi, 64, Italian footballer (Lanerossi Vicenza, Juventus, national team), world champion (1982), lung cancer.
Vishnu Savara, 70, Indian politician, Maharashtra MLA (2014–2019), cirrhosis.
Jason Slater, 49, American rock bassist (Third Eye Blind, Snake River Conspiracy, Brougham), liver failure.
Stanley Smith, 71, American racing driver, interstitial pneumonia.
Mohammad Yazdi, 89, Iranian Islamic cleric, chairman of the Assembly of Experts (2015–2016), chief justice (1989–1999) and MP (1980–1988), digestive disease.
Chowdhury Kamal Ibne Yusuf, 80, Bangladeshi politician, MP (1991–2006), minister of disaster management (2001–2006) and food (2004–2006), COVID-19.

10
Maroof Afzal, Pakistani civil servant, cabinet secretary (2019–2020), COVID-19.
Kenneth Alwyn, 95, English conductor (BBC Radio 2, London Symphony Orchestra).
Brandon Bernard, 40, American convicted murderer, execution by lethal injection.
Wallace Barnes, 94, American politician, member of the Connecticut Senate (1959–1971).
Rafael Ramón Conde Alfonzo, 77, Venezuelan Roman Catholic prelate, bishop of Maracay (2008–2009) and Margarita (1999–2008), pancreatic cancer.
Don Marion Davis, 103, American child actor (The Star Boarder, Down on the Farm, Percy). 
Astad Deboo, 73, Indian dancer and choreographer, subdural haematoma.
Billy DeMars, 95, American baseball player (St. Louis Browns) and coach (Philadelphia Phillies, Cincinnati Reds).
Dudu Duswara, 69, Indonesian jurist, justice of Supreme Court (since 2011), COVID-19.
Jim Fleming, 78, Scottish footballer (Partick Thistle, Luton Town, Wigan Athletic).
Cal Hockley, 85, Canadian ice hockey player (Trail Smoke Eaters).
João Jens, 76, Brazilian Olympic volleyball player (1968, 1972).
Tommy Lister Jr., 62, American actor (Friday, The Fifth Element, No Holds Barred) and professional wrestler, cardiovascular disease.
Nemanja Miljković, 30, Serbian basketball player (Zemun Lasta, BC Vienna, Pärnu).
Victor Newman, Ghanaian politician.
Juan Pérez-Giménez, 79, American jurist, judge (since 1979) and chief judge (1984–1991) of the U.S. District Court for Puerto Rico.
Ram Lal Rahi, 86, Indian politician, MP (1977–1984, 1989–1996) and minister of state for home affairs (1991–1996), complications from COVID-19.
Odette Richard, 32, South African Olympic rhythmic gymnast (2008).
Garry Runciman, 3rd Viscount Runciman of Doxford, 86, British historical sociologist.
José Mario Ruiz Navas, 90, Ecuadorian Roman Catholic prelate, bishop of Latacunga (1968–1989) and archbishop of Portoviejo (1989–2007).
Joseph Safra, 82, Lebanese-Brazilian banker and venture capitalist, founder of Banco Safra.
Iman Budhi Santosa, 72, Indonesian author, heart attack.
Myriam Sienra, 81, Paraguayan actress (7 Boxes) and journalist.
Andrzej Skowroński, 67, Polish Olympic rower (1980).
Carol Sutton, 76, American actress (Steel Magnolias, Ray, Monster's Ball), complications from COVID-19.
Bryan Sykes, 73, British geneticist.
Dame Barbara Windsor, 83, English actress (EastEnders, Carry On, Chitty Chitty Bang Bang), complications from Alzheimer's disease.
Barry Wynks, 68, New Zealand lawn bowler.
Rahnaward Zaryab, 76, Afghan novelist, journalist, and literary critic, COVID-19.

11
Jim Burns, 75, American basketball player (Chicago Bulls, Dallas Chaparrals) and Illinois inspector general.
Per Carlsen, 72, Danish diplomat, ambassador to Lithuania (1997–2001), Russia and Belarus (2005–2010) and Latvia (2010–2015). (death announced on this date)
Artyom Chernov, 38, Russian ice hockey player (HC Vityaz, Metallurg Novokuznetsk), heart attack.
Beryl Cunningham, 74, Jamaican actress and model.
Farid Abraão David, 76, Brazilian politician, mayor of Nilópolis (2001–2009, 2017–2020), COVID-19.
Roy Douglas, 95, British academic and political activist.
D. E. Ethiraj, 86, Indian footballer (Mysore, national team).
Gotthilf Fischer 92, German choral conductor (Fischer-Chöre).
James Flynn, 86, American-born New Zealand intelligence researcher.
Đurđa Ivezić, 84, Croatian actress (H-8, Back of the Medal, The Magician's Hat), COVID-19.
Carol R. Johnson, 91, American landscape architect.
Ian Johnston, 91, Canadian Olympic field hockey player.
Boniface Kabaka, Kenyan politician, senator (since 2017), stroke.
Kim Ki-duk, 59, South Korean film director (The Isle, Spring, Summer, Fall, Winter... and Spring, 3-Iron), complications from COVID-19.
Alva Hugh Maddox, 90, American jurist, justice of the Supreme Court of Alabama (1969–2001).
Malik, 72, Belgian comic book artist (Cupidon).
Sam Nda-Isaiah, 58, Nigerian political columnist, entrepreneur and journalist, founder of Leadership.
Joseph Nyagah, 72, Kenyan politician, COVID-19.
Sven Sachsalber, 33, Italian artist.
Lev Shcheglov, 74, Russian sexologist and psychotherapist, COVID-19.
Charlotte Tillar Schexnayder, 96, American politician, member of the Arkansas House of Representatives (1985–1999).
Mongkol Na Songkhla, 79, Thai politician, minister of public health (2006–2008), cancer.
Andrzej Tomaszewicz, 77, Polish historian and politician, Solidarity activist, senator (1989–1991).
Richard Tötterman, 94, Finnish diplomat.
Leslie Ungerleider, 74, American experimental psychologist and neuroscientist.
Irena Veisaitė, 92, Lithuanian theatre scholar and human rights activist, COVID-19.

12
James Atwell, 74, British Anglican priest, dean of St Edmundsbury (2000–2006) and Winchester (2006–2016).
Bird Averitt, 68, American basketball player (San Antonio Spurs, Kentucky Colonels, Buffalo Braves), ABA champion (1975).
Ronald James Baker, 96, Canadian academic administrator, president of the University of Prince Edward Island (1969–1978).
Claude Castonguay, 91, Canadian politician, educator and businessman, senator (1990–1992) and Quebec MNA (1970–1973).
Nicolas Chumachenco, 76, Polish violinist.
Escurinho, 90, Brazilian footballer (Villa Nova, Fluminense, national team).
Valentin Gaft, 85, Russian actor (Hello, I'm Your Aunt!, Say a Word for the Poor Hussar, Forgotten Melody for a Flute), People's Artist of the RSFSR (1984).
Alfonso Gagliano, 78, Canadian politician, MP (1984–2002), minister of labour (1996–1997) and public works and government services (1997–2002).
Victor Gnanapragasam, 80, Sri Lankan Roman Catholic prelate, vicar apostolic of Quetta (since 2001), heart attack.
Anneli Haaranen, 86, Finnish Olympic swimmer (1952).
Terry Kay, 82, American author (To Dance with the White Dog), liver cancer.
U. A. Khader, 85, Indian author, lung cancer.
Damir Kukuruzović, 45, Croatian jazz guitarist, COVID-19.
John le Carré, 89, British-Irish author (Tinker Tailor Soldier Spy, The Night Manager, The Little Drummer Girl), pneumonia.
Motjeka Madisha, 25, South African footballer (Highlands Park, Mamelodi Sundowns, national team), traffic collision.
John McSeveney, 89, Scottish football player (Newport County, Hull City) and manager (Barnsley).
Janos Mohoss, 84, Swiss Olympic fencer (1972), COVID-19.
Dick Murphy, 89, American baseball player (Cincinnati Redlegs).
Dennis Parmenter, 69, American politician.
Ferruccio Pisoni, 84, Italian politician, deputy (1968–1983).
Jerzy Mikułowski Pomorski, 83, Polish sociologist, rector of the Kraków University of Economics (1990–1996).
Charley Pride, 86, American Hall of Fame singer ("Kiss an Angel Good Mornin'", "Is Anybody Goin' to San Antone") and baseball player (Memphis Red Sox), complications from COVID-19.
Ann Reinking, 71, American choreographer and actress (Chicago, Fosse, Annie), Tony winner (1997).
Jack Steinberger, 99, German-born American physicist, Nobel Prize laureate (1988).
Alex Treves, 91, Italian-born American Olympic fencer.
Gene Tyranny, 75, American avant-garde composer and pianist, diabetes.
Gloria Vaughn, 84, American politician, member of the New Mexico House of Representatives (1995–2010).
John Ffowcs Williams, 85, British engineer.
Fikre Selassie Wogderess, 75, Ethiopian politician, prime minister (1987–1989), complications from diabetes.
Ruhollah Zam, 42, Iranian political activist and journalist, execution by hanging.

13
Joseph Bachelder III, 88, American lawyer.
Amedeo Baldizzone, 60, Italian football player (Atalanta, Cagliari, Piacenza) and coach.
Frank Baumann, 87, American baseball player (Boston Red Sox, Chicago White Sox, Chicago Cubs).
Laszlo Berkowits, 92, Hungarian-born American Reform rabbi and Holocaust survivor.
Otto Barić, 87, Croatian football player (Lokomotiva Zagreb) and manager (Rapid Wien, national team), COVID-19.
Robert Bloxom, 83, American politician, Virginia Secretary of Agriculture and Forestry (2005–2010) and member of the House of Delegates (1978–2004).
Dirk Bolt, 90, Dutch architect and urban planner.
Jorge Bruni, 79, Uruguayan politician and lawyer, minister of the interior (2009–2010).
Greg Burdine, 61, American politician, member of the Alabama House of Representatives (2010–2014).
Carlos Eduardo Cadoca, 80, Brazilian lawyer and politician, member of the Chamber of Deputies (1999–2019), COVID-19.
Al Cohen, 94, American magician.
Jimmy Collins, 74, American basketball player (Chicago Bulls) and coach (UIC Flames), complications from heart surgery.
Ambrose Mandvulo Dlamini, 52, Swazi politician, prime minister (since 2018), COVID-19.
John H. Elliott, 85, American biblical scholar.
Bannanje Govindacharya, 84, Indian literary scholar.
R. Heli, 86, Indian agriculturalist and journalist, heart attack.
Noer Muhammad Iskandar, 65, Indonesian Islamic cleric.
Nur Hossain Kasemi, 75, Bangladeshi Islamic scholar, co-chair of Al-Haiatul Ulya (since 2020), secretary general of Jamiat Ulema (since 2015) and Hefazat (since 2020), respiratory failure.
Yevgeny Khoroshevtsev, 76, Russian announcer and actor, complications from COVID-19.
P. Krishnamoorthy, 77, Indian art director (Swathi Thirunal, Oru Vadakkan Veeragatha, Vanna Vanna Pookkal) and costume designer.
Pierre Lacroix, 72, Canadian ice hockey executive, president of the Quebec Nordiques and Colorado Avalanche (1994–2006), COVID-19.
Catie Lazarus, 44, American comedian, writer, and podcaster (Employee of the Month), breast cancer.
Shahid Mahmood, 81, Pakistani cricketer (Karachi Whites, national team).
Minoru Makihara, 90, English-born Japanese business executive (Mitsubishi Corporation), heart failure. 
Philip Martin, 82, English television writer (Gangsters, Doctor Who, Z Cars). 
Jimmy McLane, 90, American swimmer, Olympic champion (1948, 1952).
Helena de Menezes, 93, Brazilian Olympic sprinter.
Jaroslav Mostecký, 57, Czech science fiction writer, COVID-19.
Leith Mullings, 75, Jamaican-born American anthropologist, president of the American Anthropological Association (2011–2013), cancer.
William Imon Norwood, 79, American pediatric cardiac surgeon and physician.
Rose Ochi, 81, Japanese-American attorney and civil rights activist, complications from COVID-19.
Rose Pere, 83, New Zealand educationalist and conservationist.
Radhika Ranjan Pramanik, 87, Indian politician, MP (1989–2004).
Sal Rocca, 74, Italian-born American politician, member of the Michigan House of Representatives (1975–1980, 1983–1994, 2001–2004), COVID-19.
Barry Sonshine, 72, Canadian Olympic equestrian (1968).
Pauline Anna Strom, 74, American electronic music producer.
Paul Wass, 95, American politician, member of the Pennsylvania House of Representatives (1977–1990).
Reginald Wilson, 93, American psychologist.

14
Elbrus Abbasov, 69–70, Azerbaijani footballer (SKA Rostov-on-Don, Neftchi Baku PFC) and manager (Qarabağ), COVID-19.
Benjamin Abeles, 95, Austrian physicist.
Herman Asaribab, 56, Indonesian army officer, deputy chief of staff (since 2020), commander of Cendrawasih (2019–2020) and Tanjungpura (2019).
Mamye BaCote, 81, American politician, member of the Virginia House of Delegates (2004–2016).
Claudio Baiocchi, 80, Italian mathematician.
Marvin Bell, 83, American professor and poet, poet laureate of Iowa (2000–2004).
Jim Berry, 75, Canadian soccer player (national team), Parkinson's disease and heart failure.
Alpha Boucher, 77, Canadian actor, cancer.
Don Calhoun, 68, American football player (New England Patriots, Buffalo Bills).
Demetrios James Caraley, 88, American political scientist.
Vera Carstairs, 95, British social scientist.
Paul M. Cook, 96, American businessman, founder of Raychem.
Eric Freeman, 76, Australian cricketer (South Australia, national team), heart attack.
Joe Frickleton, 85, Scottish football player (East Stirlingshire) and manager (Highlands Park, Kaizer Chiefs), complications from dementia.
Segundo Galicia Sánchez, 82, Peruvian professor and sociologist.
Gérard Houllier, 73, French football manager (Liverpool, Lyon, national team), complications from heart surgery. 
Huang Zongying, 95, Chinese actress (Rhapsody of Happiness, Crows and Sparrows, Women Side by Side).
Earl Hutto, 94, American politician, member of the U.S. House of Representatives (1979–1995) and Florida House of Representatives (1972–1976).
Benichandra Jamatia, 90, Indian writer.
Lamine Khene, 89, Algerian politician.
Richard Laird, 81, American politician, member of the Alabama House of Representatives (1978–2014), COVID-19.
Michael F. Land, 78, British neurobiologist.
Piotr Machalica, 65, Polish actor (Hero of the Year, Dekalog: Nine, A Short Film About Love), COVID-19.
Tony Morrin, 74, English footballer (Exeter City, Stockport County, Bury).
Jeannie Morris, 85, American sports journalist (Chicago American, Chicago Daily News) and author, appendix cancer.
Roddam Narasimha, 87, Indian aerospace engineer and fluid dynamicist, brain hemorrhage.
Milomir Odović, 65, Bosnian football player (Željezničar Sarajevo, Linz) and manager (Slavija Sarajevo). 
Jack Page, 70, American politician, member of the Alabama House of Representatives (1993–2010), COVID-19.
Paulo César dos Santos, 68, Brazilian musician (Roupa Nova), complications from COVID-19.
Günter Sawitzki, 88, German footballer (VfB Stuttgart, national team).
George Sharples, 77, English footballer (Blackburn Rovers, Everton, Southport), esophageal cancer.
Hanna Stankówna, 82, Polish actress (The Real End of the Great War, Lokis, The Third Part of the Night).
Dennis B. Sullivan, 93, American brigadier general.
José María de la Torre Martín, 68, Mexican Roman Catholic prelate, bishop of Aguascalientes (since 2008), COVID-19.
Totilas, 20, Dutch dressage horse, world championship winner (2010), colic.
Darold Treffert, 87, American psychiatrist and research director.
Seppo Vainio, 83, Finnish Olympic ice hockey player (1960).
Marcelo Veiga, 56, Brazilian football player (Santos, Internacional) and manager (Bragantino), complications from COVID-19.
Tarcisius Gervazio Ziyaye, 71, Malawian Roman Catholic prelate, archbishop of Lilongwe (since 2001).

15
John Aldred, 99, English sound engineer (Anne of the Thousand Days, Mary, Queen of Scots, Dr. Strangelove).
Awesome Again, 26, Canadian Hall of Fame racehorse and sire.
Ungku Abdul Aziz, 98, Malaysian economist, vice-chancellor of the University of Malaya (1968–1988).
Irving Banister, 87, American guitarist.
Anthony Casso, 78, American mobster (Lucchese crime family), COVID-19.
Caroline Cellier, 75, French actress (This Man Must Die, L'emmerdeur, A Thousand Billion Dollars).
Sudhir Chakraborty, 86, Indian anthropologist, heart attack.
Frank Christopherson Jr., 93, American politician, member of the Wisconsin State Assembly (1959–1963) and the Senate (1963–1967).
Manuel Costas, 78, Spanish footballer (Sevilla FC).
Orlando Duarte, 88, Brazilian sports journalist, COVID-19.
Feng Duan, 97, Chinese physicist, member of the Chinese Academy of Sciences and delegate to the National People's Congress (1983–1994).
Paul Foreman, 81, Jamaican Olympic long jumper (1960), Commonwealth Games gold medalist (1958).
Donald Fowler, 85, American politician, chair of the Democratic National Committee (1995–1997), leukemia complicated by COVID-19.
Jorge García, 63, Spanish footballer (Deportivo de La Coruña).
George Gibbs, 83, British special effects artist (Indiana Jones and the Temple of Doom, Who Framed Roger Rabbit, Alien 3), Oscar winner (1985, 1989).
Jim Gorst, 98, Canadian politician.
Alejandro Grullón, 91, Dominican banker.
Fati Habib-Jawula, 78, Ghanaian diplomat.
James Havard, 83, American painter.
Rita Houston, 59, American DJ (WFUV), ovarian cancer.
Paul Lamey, 81, American Olympic bobsledder (1968, 1972).
Jean-Pierre Lux, 74, French rugby union player (US Tyrosse, US Dax, national team) and administrator.
Paul Nihill, 81, British race walker, Olympic silver medallist (1964), COVID-19.
Tommy Ord, 68, English footballer (Rochester Lancers, Vancouver Whitecaps, Seattle Sounders).
Zoltan Sabo, 48, Serbian-Hungarian football player (Vojvodina, Partizan) and manager (Hajduk Kula), pulmonary embolism.
Noureddine Saïl, 73, Moroccan film critic and writer, COVID-19.
Bruce Seals, 67, American basketball player (Seattle SuperSonics, Utah Stars).
Lerrel Sharp, 87, Australian footballer (Collingwood).
Charles Shere, 85, American composer.
Petro Slobodyan, 67, Ukrainian football player (Dynamo Kyiv, Soviet Union national team) and manager (Obolon Kyiv).
Saufatu Sopoanga, 68, Tuvaluan politician, prime minister (2002–2004).

16
Yaakov Agmon, 91, Israeli theatre producer, manager and director.
Ian Armstrong, 83, Australian politician, NSW MP (1981–2007) and deputy premier of New South Wales (1993–1995).
Waldemaro Bartolozzi, 93, Italian racing cyclist.
William Beaty Boyd, 97, American academic administrator, president of Central Michigan University (1968–1975) and University of Oregon (1975–1980).
Emil Cadkin, 100, American composer (The Big Fix, The Killer Shrews).
Jeff Clayton, 66, American jazz saxophonist, complications from kidney cancer.
Flavio Cotti, 81, Swiss politician, president (1991, 1998) and member of the Federal Council (1986–1999), COVID-19.
Marcus D'Amico, 55, German-born British actor (Tales of the City, Full Metal Jacket, Superman II), pneumonia.
Tesfaye Gessesse, 83, Ethiopian actor, general director of the Hager Fikir Theatre (1974–1975).
Jean Graetz, 90, American civil rights activist, lung cancer.
Bill Holm, 95, American art historian and author.
Irfan Husain, 76, Pakistani newspaper columnist (Dawn) and civil servant.
Steve Ingle, 74, English footballer (Bradford City, Wrexham), COVID-19.
Peter Yariyok Jatau, 89, Nigerian Roman Catholic prelate, archbishop of Kaduna (1975–2007).
Lenn Keller, 69, American photographer and archivist, cancer.
Valentyn Khodukin, 81, Ukrainian football player (Sokil Lviv) and manager (Skala Stryi, Dynamo Lviv).
Joseph Kyeong Kap-ryong, 90, South Korean Roman Catholic prelate, bishop of Daejeon (1984–2005).
Leticia Lee, 56, Hong Kong pro-establishment activist, COVID-19.
Otto Leodolter, 84, Austrian ski jumper, Olympic bronze medalist (1960).
Carl Mann, 78, American rockabilly singer.
Elizabeth Meckes, 40, American mathematician, colon cancer.
Brian Pickworth, 91, New Zealand Olympic fencer (1960).
Kálmán Sóvári, 79, Hungarian footballer (Újpesti Dózsa, national team).
Wacław Szybalski, 99, Polish biotechnologist and oncologist.
Lorenzo Taliaferro, 28, American football player (Baltimore Ravens), heart attack.
Stephen Tjephe, 65, Burmese Roman Catholic prelate, bishop of Loikaw (since 2015).
Adela de Torrebiarte, 71, Guatemalan politician, deputy (since 2020), president of the National Football Federation (2016–2017) and minister of the interior (2007–2008), lung cancer. 
Renê Weber, 59, Brazilian football player (Vitória de Guimarães, national team) and manager (Caxias), COVID-19.

17
Namat Abdullah, 74, Malaysian footballer (Penang, national team), colorectal cancer.
Franck Balandier, 68, French writer.
Donato Bilancia, 69, Italian serial killer, COVID-19.
Hacke Björksten, 86, Finnish-Swedish jazz bandleader and saxophonist.
Paddy Blagden, 85, British army officer.
Abdelwahab Bouhdiba, 88, Tunisian academic and sociologist.
Jeremy Bulloch, 75, English actor (Star Wars, The Spy Who Loved Me, Mary, Queen of Scots), complications from Parkinson's disease.
Krzysztof Bulski, 33, Polish chess player.
Pierre Buyoya, 71, Burundian politician, president (1987–1993, 1996–2003), COVID-19.
Kim Chernin, 80, American feminist writer and poet, COVID-19.
Stanley Cowell, 79, American jazz pianist, co-founder of Strata-East Records, hypovolemic shock.
Doug Crane, 85, American animator (He-Man and the Masters of the Universe, The Smurfs, Beavis and Butt-Head Do America), cancer.
Rod Crewther, 75, Australian physicist.
Les Dicker, 93, English footballer (Chelmsford City, Tottenham Hotspur, Southend United).
Allen Dines, 99, American politician, member of the Colorado House of Representatives (1957–1966), Senate (1966–1974) and speaker (1965–1966).
Enrico Ferri, 78, Italian jurist and politician, minister of public works (1988–1989), deputy (1992–1994) and MEP (1989–2004).
Jim Fives, 91, Irish hurler and Gaelic footballer.
Maciej Grubski, 52, Polish politician, senator (2007–2019), COVID-19.
Arnold D. Gruys, 92, American politician, member of the Minnesota House of Representatives (1967–1971), complications from COVID-19.
Tom Hanneman, 68, American broadcaster (WCCO-TV, Fox Sports North) and sports commentator (Minnesota Timberwolves).
Jacó Roberto Hilgert, 94, Brazilian Roman Catholic prelate, bishop of Cruz Alta (1976–2002).
W. Nathaniel Howell, 81, American diplomat, ambassador to Kuwait (1987–1991).
John Barnard Jenkins, 87, Welsh nationalist.
Ejner Jensen, 91, Danish footballer (Vanløse IF, national team).
Valentin Kasabov, 62, Bulgarian politician, MP (since 2014), COVID-19.
Hennadiy Kernes, 61, Ukrainian politician, mayor of Kharkiv (since 2010), complications from COVID-19.
Iqbal Ahmad Khan, 66, Indian classical vocalist.
Tuncay Mataracı, 85, Turkish politician, minister of customs and monopolies (1978–1979), COVID-19.
Spencer MacCallum, 88, American anthropologist.
Dawson McAllister, 74, American radio host and author.
Leif Mills, 84, British trade unionist, president of the Trades Union Congress (1995), vascular disease.
Lorraine Monk, 98, Canadian photographer.
Benny Napoleon, 65, American police officer, sheriff of Wayne County, Michigan (since 2009), complications from COVID-19.
Ed Nichols, 97, British-born New Zealand Paralympic alpine skier (1980).
Tim de Paravicini, 75, English audio designer.
Rod Perry, 86, American actor (S.W.A.T., The Black Godfather, The Black Gestapo).
Ignaz Puschnik, 86, Austrian footballer (Kapfenberger SV, national team).
Harold E. Robinson, 88, American botanist and entomologist.
Christina Rodrigues, 57, Brazilian actress, complications from COVID-19.
Giovanni Sacco, 77, Italian footballer (Juventus, Atalanta, Reggiana), COVID-19.
Freddie Santos, 64, Filipino theatre and concert director.
Srđan Savić, 89, Bosnian Olympic sprinter (1960).
R. N. Shetty, 92, Indian entrepreneur and philanthropist, heart attack.
Satya Deo Singh, 75, Indian politician, MP (1991–1998), cardiac arrest and COVID-19.
Bolivia Suárez, 63, Venezuelan politician, deputy (since 2016), COVID-19.
Bill Sveinson, 74, Canadian poker player and politician.
Pelle Svensson, 77, Swedish wrestler and lawyer, Olympic silver medallist (1964), cancer.

18
Roger Berlind, 90, American theatre producer (Amadeus, The Book of Mormon, Guys and Dolls), 25-time Tony winner, cardiopulmonary arrest.
Charlie Brooker, 88, Canadian ice hockey player, Olympic bronze medallist (1956).
Bill Bullard Jr., 77, American politician, member of the Michigan Senate (1996–2002) and House of Representatives (1983–1996), complications from COVID-19 and cancer.
Pete Cassidy, 86, American college basketball coach (Cal State Northridge).
William J. Castagna, 96, American jurist, judge of the U.S. District Court for Middle Florida (since 1979).
Joan Dougherty, 93, Canadian politician, Quebec MNA (1981–1987), complications from COVID-19.
Han Grijzenhout, 87, Dutch football manager (Cercle Brugge, Eendracht Aalst, K.A.A. Gent).
John Harbison, 84, Irish pathologist.
Armin Hofmann, 100, Swiss graphic designer.
Michael Jeffery, 83, Australian military officer, governor of Western Australia (1993–2000) and governor-general (2003–2008).
Eddie Lee Jackson, 71, American politician, member of the Illinois House of Representatives (2009–2017), COVID-19.
Peter Lamont, 91, British art director and production designer (Goldfinger, Aliens, Titanic), Oscar winner (1998).
Michał Marusik, 69, Polish politician, MEP (2014–2019).
Aminul Islam Mintu, 81, Bangladeshi film editor (Goriber Bou, Ajante), COVID-19.
Peter M. Neumann, 79, British mathematician, COVID-19.
Rahah Noah, 87, Malaysian socialite, spouse of the deputy prime minister (1957–1970) and of the prime minister (1970–1976).
John Obiero Nyagarama, 74, Kenyan politician, governor of Nyamira County (since 2013), COVID-19.
Peter Takeo Okada, 79, Japanese Roman Catholic prelate, archbishop of Tokyo (2000–2017), esophageal cancer.
José Vicente Rangel, 91, Venezuelan politician, vice president (2002–2007) and minister of foreign affairs (1999–2001), cardiac arrest.
Òscar Ribas Reig, 84, Andorran politician, prime minister (1982–1984, 1990–1994).
Jerry Relph, 76, American politician, member of the Minnesota Senate (since 2017), complications from COVID-19.
Ray Rogers, 89, American politician, member of the Mississippi House of Representatives (1984–2020).
Aristóteles Sandoval, 46, Mexican politician, Governor of Jalisco (2013–2018), shot.
Joseph L. Scanlan, 91, American film director.
Robina Sentongo, Ugandan politician, MP (since 2016), COVID-19.
Tim Severin, 80, British explorer, historian and writer, cancer.
Valentin Shurchanov, 73, Russian politician and journalist, deputy (1999–2003, since 2007), COVID-19.
Victor Snieckus, 83, Lithuanian-born Canadian synthetic organic chemist.
Sun Weiben, 92, Chinese politician, Communist Party secretary of Liaoning (1982–1985) and Heilongjiang (1985–1994).
William Winter, 97, American politician, governor (1980–1984) and lieutenant governor of Mississippi (1972–1976), member of the Mississippi House of Representatives (1947–1959).
Yazid Zerhouni, 83, Tunisian-born Algerian politician.

19
Shirley Abrahamson, 87, American jurist, justice (1976–2019) and chief justice (1996–2015) of the Wisconsin Supreme Court, pancreatic cancer.
John Ahern, 86, American politician, member of the Washington House of Representatives (2001–2009, 2011–2013).
Doc Ayers, 98, American football coach (Piedmont College).
Art Berglund, 80, American ice hockey coach and executive (national team).
Anthony Birley, 83, British ancient historian and archaeologist (Vindolanda), lung cancer.
Peter Boddington, 78, British boxer, COVID-19.
Mile Bogović, 81, Croatian Roman Catholic prelate, bishop of Gospić-Senj (2000–2016), COVID-19.
Barbara M. Byrne, 85, Canadian quantitative psychologist.
Nedo Fiano, 95, Italian writer and Holocaust survivor.
Joan Milke Flores, 84, American politician, member of the Los Angeles City Council (1983–1993), complications from myelodysplastic syndrome.
David Giler, 77, American screenwriter (The Parallax View, The Money Pit) and film producer (Alien), cancer.
Paul Hänni, 93, Swiss Olympic wrestler.
Kirunda Kivejinja, 85, Ugandan politician, minister of East African Community Affairs (since 2016), COVID-19.
Rosalind Knight, 87, British actress (Carry On, Tom Jones, Gimme Gimme Gimme).
Marjan Lazovski, 58, Macedonian basketball player and coach (Vardar, AMAK SP, national team), COVID-19.
Judith Loganbill, 67, American politician, member of the Kansas House of Representatives (2001–2013).
Sir Mekere Morauta, 74, Papua New Guinean politician, prime minister (1999–2002), cancer.
Märta Norberg, 98, Swedish Olympic cross-country skier (1952).
Leo Panitch, 75, Canadian political philosopher, viral pneumonia from COVID-19.
Maria Piątkowska, 89, Polish Olympic athlete (1952, 1960, 1964), COVID-19.
Hermina Pipinić, 92, Croatian actress (Square of Violence, La steppa, Old Surehand).
Eileen Pollock, 73, Northern Irish actress (Bread, Far and Away, Angela's Ashes).
Carmen Quidiello, 105, Cuban-born Dominican playwright and poet, first lady of the Dominican Republic (1963).
Mohan Rawale, 72, Indian politician, MP (1991–2009).
Narindar Saroop, 91, Indian-born British businessman.
Elaine Stack, 89, American judge, justice of the Supreme Court of New York (2000–2008), COVID-19.
Margaret Tebbit, Lady Tebbit, 86, English nurse.
Themie Thomai, 75, Albanian politician, minister of agriculture (1975–1989), COVID-19.
Alberto Valdés Jr., 70, Mexican equestrian, Olympic bronze medallist (1980).
Bram van der Vlugt, 86, Dutch actor (Pastorale 1943, Tropic of Emerald, Family), COVID-19.
Elmar Zeitler, 93, German physicist.

20
Samsuddin Ahmed, 75, Bangladeshi politician, MP (2001–2006), COVID-19.
Raymon Anning, 90, British police officer, commissioner of police of Hong Kong (1985–1989).
Doug Anthony, 90, Australian politician, deputy prime minister (1971–1972, 1975–1983) and MP (1957–1984).
Anthony Banzi, 74, Tanzanian Roman Catholic prelate, bishop of Tanga (since 1994).
Nicette Bruno, 87, Brazilian actress (Sétimo Sentido, Louco Amor, Perigosas Peruas), complications from COVID-19.
Arthur Campbell, 95, New Zealand analytical chemist.
Zee Edgell, 80, Belizean-born American novelist, cancer.
Bill Groethe, 97, American photographer.
Billy Harris, 77, American baseball player (Cleveland Indians, Kansas City Royals).
Svatopluk Karásek, 78, Czech Evangelical priest, politician, and dissident (Charter 77), deputy (2002–2006).
Gogi Kavtaradze, 80, Georgian actor (Don't Grieve, Melodies of Vera Quarter, Wounded Game).
David Knight, 92, American actor (The Newcomers).
Delfino López Aparicio, 60, Mexican politician, deputy (since 2018), COVID-19.
Susan Moore, 52, American physician, complications from COVID-19.
Monzur-I-Mowla, 80, Bangladeshi poet, director general of the Bangla Academy (1982–1986), COVID-19.
Inés Moreno, 88, Argentine actress (Behind a Long Wall).
Florencio Olvera Ochoa, 87, Mexican Roman Catholic prelate, bishop of Cuernavaca (2002–2009).
Rukhshana, 80, Afghan singer.
Nasser Sabah Al-Ahmad Al-Sabah, 72, Kuwaiti royal, minister of defense (2017–2019).
Yvonne Sandberg-Fries, 70, Swedish politician, MEP (2003–2004), MR (1982–1996).
Julius Schachter, 84, American microbiologist, COVID-19.
Romolo Tavoni, 94, Italian motor racing executive (Ferrari).
Richard Vande Hoef, 95, American politician, member of the Iowa Senate (1981–1993) and House of Representatives (1993–1999).
Ezra Vogel, 90, American scholar (Japan as Number One: Lessons for America, Deng Xiaoping and the Transformation of China), complications from surgery.
Lee Wallace, 90, American actor (Batman, Private Benjamin, The Taking of Pelham One Two Three).
Dame Fanny Waterman, 100, English pianist, founder of the Leeds International Piano Competition.
Dietrich Weise, 86, German football player (Neckarsulm) and manager (Eintracht Frankfurt, Egypt national team).
Peter Williams, 81, British motorcycle racer.
Ned Wynn, 79, American actor (The Bellboy, Bikini Beach, Beach Blanket Bingo), complications from Parkinson's disease.

21
Hank Adams, 77, American Native American rights activist.
Ronald Anderson, 79, American sociologist.
Frederik Batti Sorring, 65, Indonesian politician, regent of North Toraja (2011–2016), COVID-19.
Boris Bushmelev, 83, Russian film director (The Evening Labyrinth).
Urso Chappell, 53, American graphic designer and world's fair historian, cirrhosis.
Ikenwoli Godfrey Emiko, 65, Nigerian traditional ruler, olu of Warri (since 2015), COVID-19.
Gilberto Ensástiga, 57, Mexican politician, MP (2003–2006), COVID-19.
John Fitzpatrick, 74, Scottish footballer (Manchester United).
Marcos Flegmann, 30, Mexican-born American rugby player, bone cancer.
Donald A. S. Fraser, 95, Canadian statistician.
Tadeusz Górczyk, 59, Polish politician and journalist, deputy (1991–1993).
Sandy Grant Gordon, 89, Scottish distiller (Glenfiddich).
Kevin Greene, 58, American Hall of Fame football player (Pittsburgh Steelers, Los Angeles Rams) and coach (Green Bay Packers), heart attack.
Dorothy Henry, 95, American newspaper artist and cartoonist.
Sir John Hills, 66, British social scientist, cancer.
Mark Joseph, 63, Filipino actor (Silip), skin cancer.
Aleksandr Kurlyandsky, 82, Russian screenwriter (Well, Just You Wait!) and author.
Tommie Lindström, 82, Swedish Olympic swimmer (1960).
Hamish McLachlan, 53, Australian Olympic rower (1988) and stock market fraudster.
Julian Moti, 55, Fijian-born Australian lawyer, attorney general of Solomon Islands (2006–2006, 2007–2007).
K. T. Oslin, 78, American country singer-songwriter ("80's Ladies", "Do Ya", "I'll Always Come Back"), Grammy winner (1988, 1989), COVID-19.
Kalsoom Perveen, 75, Pakistani politician, senator (since 2003), COVID-19.
Richard Rominger, 93, American politician, heart attack.
Karel Vachek, 80, Czech documentary film director and FAMU educator.
Motilal Vora, 93, Indian politician, minister of health and family welfare (1988–1989), MP (2002–2020) and CM of Madhya Pradesh (1985–1988, 1989), complications from COVID-19.
Eleanor Wadsworth, 103, English aviator.
Sir Arnold Wolfendale, 93, British astronomer, Astronomer Royal (1991–1995).

22
Karima Baloch, 37, Pakistani human rights activist.
Joachim Bäse, 81, German footballer (Eintracht Braunschweig, West Germany national team).
Wojciech Borowik, 64, Polish politician, Solidarity activist, deputy (1993–1997), COVID-19.
Claude Brasseur, 84, French actor (Bande à part, Such a Gorgeous Kid Like Me, A Simple Story).
Norma Cappagli, 81, Argentine model, Miss World (1960), traffic collision.
Pierre Chappuis, 90, Swiss poet.
Edmund M. Clarke, 75, American computer scientist, COVID-19.
James D. Fowler, 86, American politician.
Ed Gomes, 84, American politician, member of the Connecticut State Senate (2005–2013, 2015–2019), injuries sustained in a traffic collision.
Leo Goodman, 92, American statistician, COVID-19.
Kevin Hartley, 86, Australian amateur golfer.
Erkki Hytönen, 87, Finnish Olympic ice hockey player (1952).
H. L. Jensen, 91, American politician.
Lam Phương, 83, Vietnamese-American songwriter, complications from a stroke.
Jack Lenor Larsen, 93, American textile designer.
Paul Loridant, 72, French politician, mayor of Les Ulis (1977–2001).
Ron Lurie, 79, American politician, mayor of Las Vegas (1987–1991), COVID-19.
John Maltby, 84, English sculptor and potter.
Muhammad Mustafa Mero, 79, Syrian politician, prime minister (2000–2003), COVID-19.
Phil Rogers, 69, Welsh studio potter.
George Spriggs, 83, American baseball player (Pittsburgh Pirates, Kansas City Royals).
Özkan Sümer, 80, Turkish football player (Trabzonspor) and manager (Galatasaray, national team).
Stella Tennant, 50, British model, suicide.
Rubén Tierrablanca González, 68, Mexican-born Turkish Roman Catholic prelate, apostolic vicariate of Istanbul (since 2016), COVID-19.
Tuck Tucker, 59, American animator (Hey Arnold!, SpongeBob SquarePants, The Simpsons).
Antonio Vacca, 86, Italian Roman Catholic prelate, bishop of Alghero-Bosa (1993–2006), throat cancer.
Jay Walljasper, 65, American writer and editor, kidney cancer.
Alan Warren, 88, English priest.
Dwight Wise, 90, American politician.

23
Arkady Andreasyan, 73, Armenian football player (Ararat Yerevan, Soviet Union national team) and manager (Homenmen Beirut), Olympic bronze medallist (1972).
Lars Arge, 53, Danish computer scientist, kidney cancer.
Irani Barbosa, 70, Brazilian politician, deputy (1991–1995), COVID-19.
Charles Campion, 69, English food critic (The Times, The Independent, MasterChef).
Desmond Carnelley, 91, English archdeacon.
Richard N. Cooper, 86, American economist.
John Edrich, 83, English cricketer (Norfolk, Surrey, national team), Waldenström's macroglobulinemia.
James E. Gunn, 97, American science fiction author (The Road to Science Fiction, Star Bridge, The Listeners).
Lyle Hanson, 85, American politician, member of the North Dakota House of Representatives (1979–2012).
Yehuda Henkin, 75, Israeli Orthodox rabbi and posek.
Mannan Hira, 64, Bangladeshi playwright and film director, heart attack.
Issaka Assane Karanta, 75, Nigerien politician, Mayor of Commune I (1996–1999) and Commune III (2010–2011) of Niamey, governor of Niamey Capital District (since 2018), COVID-19.
Pero Kvrgić, 93, Croatian actor (Ne daj se, Floki, All for Free, Nausikaya).
Lonnie Laffen, 62, American politician, member of the North Dakota Senate (2010–2018), heart attack.
Rebecca Luker, 59, American actress (Mary Poppins, Show Boat, Not Fade Away), complications from amyotrophic lateral sclerosis.
Makosso IV, 76, Congolese royal, king of Loango (since 2009).
Santé Marcuzzi, 86, French Olympic rower (1956).
Eddie McLaren, 91, Scottish footballer (Reading).
Dave McNary, 69, American film journalist (Variety), complications from a stroke.
Mićo Mićić, 64, Bosnian politician, mayor of Bijeljina (since 2004), COVID-19.
Brian Morrison, 82, Australian footballer (Richmond).
Loyiso Mpumlwana, South African politician, member of the National Assembly (2014–2019, since 2020), COVID-19.
Rei Nakanishi, 82, Japanese novelist and songwriter, heart attack.
Kay Purcell, 57, English actress (Emmerdale, Tracy Beaker Returns, Waterloo Road), liver cancer.
Frankie Randall, 59, American boxer, WBC light welterweight champion (1994–1996).
Madan Lal Sharma, 68, Indian politician, MP (2004–2014).
Gilbert Shea, 92, American tennis player.
Sugathakumari, 86, Indian poet and social activist, COVID-19.
Swami Sundaranand, 94, Indian yogi, photographer, and mountaineer.
Monika Tilley, 86, Austrian-born American fashion designer.
Leslie West, 75, American singer and guitarist (Mountain, West, Bruce and Laing, The Vagrants), heart attack.
Ron Widby, 75, American basketball and football player (Dallas Cowboys, Green Bay Packers).
Joel Yanofsky, 65, Canadian novelist, cancer.
Rika Zaraï, 82, Israeli singer and writer.

24
Mouloud Achour, 76, Algerian writer.
Mitsumasa Anno, 94, Japanese children's author and illustrator (All in a Day), cirrhosis.
Mohamad Aziz, 80, Malaysian politician, MP (1999–2013) and Johor State MLA (1986–1999), kidney failure. 
Ben Binnendijk, 93, Dutch Olympic rower (1952).
Benedicto Bravo, 58, Mexican footballer (Club León, Unión de Curtidores), COVID-19.
Carl Olaf Bue Jr., 98, American jurist, judge of the U.S. District Court for Southern Texas (since 1970).
Michael J. Byrne, 79, Australian physician.
Vince Carillot, 93, American football coach.
Roland Cedermark, 82, Swedish musician.
Hubert Chesshyre, 80, British officer of arms, Clarenceux king of arms (1997–2010).
John Cremona, 102, Maltese civil servant, chief justice (1971–1981) and acting president (1976).
Braswell Deen Jr., 95, American politician.
Ernie Duplechin, 88, American football coach (Basile HS, Eunice HS) and athletics administrator (McNeese State).
Ivry Gitlis, 98, Israeli violinist.
M. A. Hashem, 78, Bangladeshi businessman (Partex Group) and politician, MP (2001–2006), COVID-19.
Danny Hodge, 88, American Hall of Fame wrestler (NWA) and boxer, Olympic silver medallist (1956), complications from Alzheimer's disease.
AKM Jahangir Hossain, 66, Bangladeshi politician, MP (1991–2008, since 2014), complications from COVID-19.
Thoriq Husler, 57, Indonesian politician, regent of East Luwu (since 2016), COVID-19.
Aleksandar Ivoš, 89, Serbian footballer (Vojvodina, K. Beringen F.C., Yugoslavia national team).
Milorad Janković, 80, Serbian footballer (Radnički Niš, Yugoslavia national team).
Pir Noor Muhammad Shah Jeelani, 69, Pakistani politician, MNA (since 2013), COVID-19.
Freshta Kohistani, 29, Afghan women's rights activist, shot.
Ahmed Lemu, 91, Nigerian Islamic scholar and jurist.
William Magee, 81, American politician, member of the New York State Assembly (1991–2018).
B. J. Marsh, 80, American politician, member of the Missouri House of Representatives (1989–1993, 2001–2009), complications from COVID-19.
Vincent Mhlanga, Swazi politician, acting prime minister (2018), COVID-19.
Bernard Mvondo-Etoga, 37, Cameroonian Olympic judoka (2004).
Jack Myers, 96, American football player (Philadelphia Eagles).
Adramé Ndiaye, 62, Senegalese Olympic basketball player (1980), COVID-19.
Idongesit Nkanga, 68, Nigerian air officer and politician, COVID-19.
Tho. Paramasivan, 69, Indian anthropologist, complications from diabetes.
Thomas W. Parks, 81, American electrical engineer.
Burt Pugach, 93, American lawyer and convicted felon.
Armando Romero, 60, Mexican footballer (Cruz Azul, Club Toluca, Correcaminos UAT), complications from COVID-19.
Benhur Salimbangon, 75, Filipino politician, member of the House of Representatives (2007–2019), cancer.
Mojmir Sepe, 90, Slovenian composer ("Brez besed", "Pridi, dala ti bom cvet", "The Earth is Dancing") and conductor.
Guy N. Smith, 81, British horror writer.
Davie Sneddon, 84, Scottish footballer (Kilmarnock, Preston North End, Raith Rovers).
Geoff Stephens, 86, English songwriter ("Sorry Suzanne", "Daughter of Darkness", "You Won't Find Another Fool Like Me") and record producer.
Siv Widerberg, 89, Swedish writer and journalist.

25
Michael Alig, 54, American club promoter and convicted killer, heroin overdose.
Djalma Bastos de Morais, 83, Brazilian politician, minister of communications (1993–1995) and president of CEMIG (1999–2015), COVID-19.
William Bentsen, 90, American Olympic sailing champion (1972).
Brian Binley, 78, British politician, MP (2005–2015).
Ivan Bogdan, 92, Ukrainian wrestler, Olympic champion (1960).
Soumaïla Cissé, 71, Malian politician, MP (since 2013) and minister of finance (1993–2000), COVID-19.
Chico Ejiro, Nigerian film producer and director, seizure.
Shamsur Rahman Faruqi, 85, Indian poet and literary critic.
Reginald Foster, 81, American Roman Catholic priest and latinist, complications from COVID-19.
Antonio Gento, 80, Spanish footballer (Racing de Santander, Real Oviedo).
Rich Herrin, 87, American college basketball coach (SIUC, Morthland College).
Tomás Irribarra, 85, Chilean politician, mayor of Quirihue (1992–1996, 2008–2012) and deputy (1969–1973).
Robin Jackman, 75, English cricketer (Surrey, Rhodesia, national team), complications from COVID-19.
K. C. Jones, 88, American Hall of Fame basketball player and coach (Boston Celtics, Washington Bullets), Olympic champion (1956) and NBA champion (1959–1966, 1984, 1986).
Ty Jordan, 19, American college football player (University of Utah), shot.
Jamal Khwaja, 92, Indian philosopher and politician, MP (1957–1962).
Oleg Kravchenko, 50, Belarusian diplomat, COVID-19.
Martin Lambie-Nairn, 75, English graphic designer (BBC, Channel 4).
Carlos Levy, 78, Argentine writer, narrator and editor, COVID-19.
Barry Lopez, 75, American author (Arctic Dreams), prostate cancer.
Edgar Meddings, 97, British Olympic bobsledder (1948).
Genevieve Musci, 106, American internet celebrity (Gramma and Ginga).
Anil Nedumangad, 48, Indian actor (Janaadhipan, Ayyappanum Koshiyum, Paapam Cheyyathavar Kalleriyatte), drowned.
Engin Nurşani, 36, Turkish-German folk musician, lung infection and cancer.
Jaan Rääts, 88, Estonian composer.
Tony Rice, 69, American Hall of Fame bluegrass guitarist (New South, David Grisman Quintet, Bluegrass Album Band).
Barbara Rose, 84, American art historian, breast cancer.
Arne Skotte, 70, Swedish footballer.
David Thorns, 77, British-born New Zealand sociologist.
Maksim Tsyhalka, 37, Belarusian footballer (Dinamo-Juni Minsk, Dinamo Minsk, national team).
Scott Vermillion, 44, American soccer player (Kansas City Wizards, Colorado Rapids), acute alcohol and prescription drug poisoning.

26
Derek Aucoin, 50, Canadian baseball player (Montreal Expos), brain cancer.
Milka Babović, 92, Croatian sprinter, hurdler and journalist, COVID-19.
George Blake, 98, British spy and double agent.
Leslie D. Campbell Jr., 95, American politician.
George Robert Carruthers, 81, American physicist and inventor.
Víctor Cuica, 71, Venezuelan saxophonist and actor.
Pat Childers, 79, American politician, member of the Wyoming House of Representatives (1997–2013).
Harper Davis, 95, American football player (Mississippi State Bulldogs, Green Bay Packers, Chicago Bears).
Johnson Gicheru, 79, Kenyan judge, chief justice (2003–2011).
Patrick Harris, 86, English bishop.
Kadambur R. Janarthanan, 91, Indian politician, MP (1984–1996, 1998–1999).
Railey Jeffrey, 75, Malaysian politician, MP (1986–2004).
Abdul Kader, 69, Bangladeshi actor (Kothao Keu Nei), cancer.
Ubong King, 48, Nigerian business consultant, security expert and motivational speaker, COVID-19.
Bronisława Kowalska, 65, Polish politician and political scientist, deputy (1993–2005), MEP (2004), COVID-19.
Sir Peter Lachmann, 89, British immunologist.
Brodie Lee, 41, American professional wrestler (AEW, WWE, ROH), idiopathic pulmonary fibrosis.
Govind Prasad Lohani, 93, Nepali diplomat and economist, respiratory failure.
Theodore Lumpkin, 100, American pilot (Tuskegee Airmen), complications from COVID-19.
Jim McLean, 83, Scottish football player (Clyde, Hamilton Academical) and manager (Dundee United), complications from dementia.
Chic McLelland, 67, Scottish football player (Aberdeen, Motherwell) and manager (Montrose).
John Miller, 88, British journalist and author.
Aubrey Mokoape, 76, South African anti-apartheid activist, COVID-19.
Gilbert Naccache, 81, Tunisian writer and far-left militant.
Cirilo Nelson, 82, Honduran botanist.
Phil Niekro, 81, American Hall of Fame baseball player (Atlanta Braves, New York Yankees, Cleveland Indians), cancer.
Maximiliano Pereira, 27, Uruguayan footballer (Miramar Misiones, Racing de Montevideo, Sport Boys), drowned.
Sergio Pintor, 83, Italian Roman Catholic prelate, bishop of Ozieri (2006–2012).
Tito Rojas, 65, Puerto Rican salsa singer, heart attack.
Gregorio Salvador Caja, 93, Spanish linguist.
Nomvuzo Shabalala, 60, South African politician, MP (since 2018), COVID-19-related illness.
Bill Sheridan, 78, American basketball coach.
Peter Schmidhuber, 89, German politician, deputy (1965–1969, 1972–1978).
William Starr, 97, American violinist.
Vic Stelly, 79, American politician, member of the Louisiana House of Representatives (1989–2005), COVID-19.
Mike Sutton, 76, English footballer (Norwich City, Chester, Carlisle United), complications from dementia.
Shirley Young, 85, American businesswoman.

27
Rolf Aggestam, 79, Swedish poet and translator.
Arthur Berckmans, 91, Belgian comics author (Sammy).
Maria Gąsienica Bukowa-Kowalska, 84, Polish Olympic cross-country skier (1956).
José Luiz Carbone, 74, Brazilian football player (Internacional, national team) and manager (Fluminense), liver cancer.
Florentino Domínguez Ordóñez, 58, Mexican politician, deputy (2003–2006), COVID-19.
Gus Ferguson, 80, Scottish-born South African poet and cartoonist.
Ed Finn, 94, Canadian politician and trade unionist.
Giorgio Galli, 92, Italian historian and political analyst.
Yuichiro Hata, 53, Japanese politician, minister of land, infrastructure, transport and tourism (2012) and member of the House of Councillors (since 1999), COVID-19.
Marian Jochman, 85, Polish Olympic long-distance runner (1960).
Roberto Junguito, 77, Colombian economist, diplomat and politician, minister of finance and public credit (2002–2003) and of agriculture and rural development (1983–1984).
Mustafa Kandıralı, 90, Turkish clarinetist.
Sunil Kothari, 87, Indian dance historian, cardiac arrest.
Saidu Kumo, 61, Nigerian politician, COVID-19.
Vikram Lall, Indian architect.
Li Guang, 106, Chinese military officer, founding major general of the PLA.
William Link, 87, American television writer (Murder, She Wrote, Columbo, Mannix), Emmy winner (1970), heart failure.
Manukura, 9, New Zealand North Island brown kiwi (hatched 2011).
Klavio Meça, 24, Albanian swimmer.
Mieczysław Morański, 60, Polish actor (Na dobre i na złe, Na Wspólnej, Plebania), COVID-19.
Ladislav Mrkvička, 81, Czech actor (Atentát, Thirty Cases of Major Zeman), Thalia Award and Czech Lion winner.
Gunga Mwinga, 45, Kenyan politician, MP (2013–2017).
Mohamed El Ouafa, 72, Moroccan diplomat and politician, ambassador to India (2000–2004), Iran (2004–2006), and Brazil (2006–2012), minister of education (2012–2013), COVID-19.
Loyd Phillips, 75, American Hall of Fame football player (Arkansas Razorbacks, Chicago Bears).
Zbigniew Pocialik, 75, Polish footballer (KS Warszawianka, Gwardia Warsaw, Beveren).
Germán Rama, 88, Uruguayan historian and academic.
Osvaldo Rivera Cianchini, 80, Puerto Rican judge, COVID-19.
Zouheïra Salem, 80, Tunisian singer.
Harold Spinka, 75, American particle physicist.
Seymour Van Gundy, 89, American nematologist.
Ken Unwin, 94, English archdeacon.
Antonio Velasco Piña, 85, Mexican novelist, spiritual writer and essayist.
D. Yasodha, 74, Indian politician, Tamil Nadu MLA (1980–1989, 2001–2011).

28
Arun Alexander, 47, Indian actor (Maanagaram, Kolamavu Kokila, Master), heart attack.
Csaba Ali, 74, Hungarian Olympic swimmer (1964).
Jack Arthurs, 98, American politician, member of the Pennsylvania House of Representatives (1971–1978).
Marc Basnight, 73, American politician, President pro tempore (1993–2011) and member (1985–2011) of the North Carolina Senate, progressive bulbar palsy.
John R. Bentson, 83, American neuroradiologist, complications from COVID-19.
Moshe Brawer, 101, Israeli geographer.
Romell Broom, 64, American convicted murderer, COVID-19.
Johnny Clark, 73, British boxer, European bantamweight champion (1973).
Othón Cuevas Córdova, 55, Mexican politician, deputy (2006–2009), COVID-19.
S. L. Dharmegowda, 65, Indian politician, deputy chairman of the Karnataka Legislative Council (since 2018), suicide by train.
Paul-Heinz Dittrich, 90, German composer.
Tom Docherty, 96, English footballer (Lincoln City, Newport County).
Jean-Marc Forneri, 61, French financier, heart attack.
Fou Ts'ong, 86, Chinese-born British pianist, COVID-19.
H. Jack Geiger, 95, American physician.
Christopher Greet, 88, Sri Lankan-born British actor (Dinnerladies, The Infinite Worlds of H. G. Wells, Prince of Persia: The Sands of Time).
Paul Sueo Hamaguchi, 72, Japanese Roman Catholic prelate, bishop of Oita (since 2011).
Jyrki Heliskoski, 75, Finnish football coach (HJK, national team).
Paul Heller, 93, American film producer (Enter the Dragon, The Wilby Conspiracy, The Pack).
George Hudson, 83, English footballer (Peterborough United, Coventry City, Tranmere Rovers).
Roy B. B. Janis, 63, Indonesian politician, MP (1992–1997, 1999–2005).
Valentin Lazarov, 89, Bulgarian Hall of Fame basketball referee.
Armando Manzanero, 85, Mexican singer-songwriter ("Somos Novios (It's Impossible)", "Mía", "Adoro"), Grammy winner (2014), COVID-19.
Frank Hampton McFadden, 95, American jurist, judge (1969–1982) and chief judge (1973–1982) of the U.S. District Court for Northern Alabama.
David Medalla, 82, Filipino sculptor.
Luis Enrique Mercado, 68, Mexican writer, journalist (El Economista) and politician, deputy (2009–2012), COVID-19.
Cy McClairen, 89, American football player (Pittsburgh Steelers), coach (Bethune-Cookman) and administrator.
Nolan Mettetal, 75, American politician, member of the Mississippi State Senate (1996–2012) and House of Representatives (2012–2020), COVID-19.
Wilma Pelly, 83, Canadian actress (North of 60, Fargo, Mixed Blessings).
John Fulton Reid, 64, New Zealand cricketer (Auckland, national team).
Madelyn Reiter, 78, American politician, member of the Minnesota Senate (2001–2007).
Les Riggs, 85, English football player (Gillingham, Newport County) and manager (Margate).
Adele Rose, 87, English television writer (Coronation Street, Z-Cars, Byker Grove), pneumonia.
Arianna W. Rosenbluth, 93, American physicist, complications from COVID-19.
Mahinder Watsa, 96, Indian sexologist.
Colin Withers, 80, English footballer (Birmingham City, Aston Villa).
Zou Deci, 86, Chinese engineer, member of the Chinese Academy of Engineering.

29
Hatem Ali, 58, Syrian television director (Salah Al-deen Al-Ayyobi, Seraa Ala El Remal, Omar) and actor, heart attack.
Claude Bolling, 90, French jazz pianist and composer (Suite for Flute and Jazz Piano Trio).
David Britton, 75, British author and publisher (Meng and Ecker).
Jessica Campbell, 38, American actress (Election).
Pierre Cardin, 98, French-Italian fashion designer.
Richard Choruma, 42, Zimbabwean footballer (Highlanders, Bloemfontein Celtic, national team), kidney failure.
Joe Louis Clark, 82, American school principal, subject of Lean on Me.
Hugh Davidson, 92, American football player (Colorado Buffaloes), coach (Montana Grizzlies), and head scout (Denver Broncos).
Josefina Echánove, 93, Mexican actress (El hombre de los hongos, The Children of Sanchez, Cabeza de Vaca), model and journalist.
Norman Golb, 92, American Semitics scholar.
Agitu Ideo Gudeta, 42, Ethiopian goat breeder and activist, beaten.
Miguel Ángel Gutiérrez Machado, 60, Mexican politician, deputy (2003–2006), COVID-19.
James Hardy, 64, American basketball player (Utah Jazz, Udinese, Olympique Antibes), heart attack.
Arne A. Jensen, 66, Norwegian media and corporate executive, CEO of TV 2 (1993–1999) and Braathens (1999–2001).
Michael Julien, 93, British songwriter ("Let's Live for Today", "Kiss Me, Honey Honey, Kiss Me", "Boom Bang-a-Bang"), COVID-19.
Dzhambulat Khatokhov, 21, Russian sumo wrestler and record holder, world's heaviest child, kidney failure.
Yevheniia Kucherenko, 98, Ukrainian pedagogue.
Alexi Laiho, 41, Finnish death metal singer-songwriter and guitarist (Children of Bodom, Sinergy, The Local Band), alcohol-related cirrhosis and pancreatitis.
Joey LaMotta, 95, American boxer and manager.
Amelia Lapeña-Bonifacio, 90, Filipino puppeteer, National Artist of the Philippines.
Luke Letlow, 41, American politician, U.S. Representative-elect, complications from COVID-19.
Hugh X. Lewis, 90, American country singer, complications from COVID-19.
Gösta Linderholm, 79, Swedish singer and composer (Rasmus på luffen), stroke.
René Lotti, 91, French Olympic rower.
Elaine McCoy, 74, Canadian politician, Senator (since 2005) and Alberta MLA (1986–1993).
Phyllis McGuire, 89, American singer (The McGuire Sisters).
Simo Mfayela, South African politician, member of the National Council of Provinces (since 2019).
Nikhil Nandy, 88, Indian Olympic footballer (1956).
Jerry O'Riordan, 81, Irish Gaelic footballer (Glenbeigh-Glencar, Kerry).
Gregory Ochiagha, 89, Nigerian Roman Catholic prelate, bishop of Orlu (1980–2008).
Corrado Olmi, 94, Italian actor and comedian (Wake Up and Die, Scandal in the Family, Madly in Love), COVID-19.
Daniel S. Paletko, 70, American politician, mayor of Dearborn Heights, Michigan (since 2004), member of the Michigan House of Representatives (2003–2004), COVID-19.
Serafim Papakostas, 61, Greek Orthodox prelate, metropolitan of Kastoria (since 1996), COVID-19.
John Paul Jr., 60, American racing driver and convicted criminal, Huntington's disease.
Geoffrey Robinson, 83, Australian Roman Catholic prelate, auxiliary bishop of Sydney (1984–2004).
Vincenzo Rosito, 81, Italian footballer (Potenza, Pistoiese, Mantova).
Howard J. Rubenstein, 88, American lawyer and public relations expert.
Rudy Salas, 71, American musician (El Chicano, Tierra).
Shabba Doo, 65, American dancer (The Lockers) and actor (Breakin', Breakin' 2: Electric Boogaloo).
Luigi Snozzi, 88, Swiss architect, COVID-19.
Jeanine Toulouse, 97, French Olympic sprinter (1948).
Tommy Turtle, 70, British soldier, cancer.
Jean Valentine, 86, American poet, New York State Poet Laureate (2008–2010), complications from Alzheimer's disease.
Indira Joseph Venniyoor, 94, Indian broadcaster (All India Radio).
Kees Verkade, 79, Dutch sculptor and artist.
John Waine, 90, English bishop.
Sofia Zhukova, 81, Russian serial killer, COVID-19.

30
Aldo Andretti, 80, Italian-born American racing driver, COVID-19.
Guillem Areny, 89, Andorran politician, mayor of La Massana (1962–1963) and member of the Council General (1966–1969, 1974–1981).
Ronald Atkins, 104, British politician, MP (1966–1970, 1974–1979).
Brenda Banks, 72, American animator (King of the Hill, The Lord of the Rings, The Smurfs).
Ivan Baumgartner, 86, Australian footballer.
Bob Bessoir, 88, American college basketball coach (Scranton Royals).
George Blasse, 86, Dutch chemist.
Jos Compaan, 62, Dutch Olympic rower (1980, 1984, 1988).
Josep Corominas i Busqueta, 81, Spanish doctor and politician, deputy (1989–2000) and grand master of the Grand Lodge of Spain (2002–2006).
Peter Craze, 74, British actor (Doctor Who).
Seaman Dan, 91, Australian musician.
Eugene Peyton Deatrick, 96, American Air Force colonel and test pilot.
Grace L. Drake, 94, American politician, member of the Ohio Senate (1984–2000).
Robert A. Frosch, 92, American scientist, administrator of NASA (1977–1981).
Gaztelu, 74, Spanish footballer (Real Sociedad).
Andrew Han Jingtao, 99, Chinese Roman Catholic clandestine prelate, bishop of Sipingjie (since 1982).
Frank Kimbrough, 64, American post-bop jazz pianist.
Samuel Little, 80, American serial killer.
Milan Lučanský, 51, Slovak police general, president of the Slovak Police Force (2018–2020), suicide by hanging.
Yehoshua Matza, 89, Israeli politician, member of the Knesset (1984–2002).
Metin Orgarun, 60, Turkish Olympic judoka (1984).
Panusunan Pasaribu, 74, Indonesian civil servant and politician, regent of Central Tapanuli (1995–2001).
Stephen Prince, 65, American film critic and historian. 
Alto Reed, 72, American saxophonist (Bob Seger and the Silver Bullet Band, Little Feat, Grand Funk Railroad), colon cancer.
LaWanna Shurtliff, 85, American politician, member of the Utah House of Representatives (1999–2008, since 2019), pneumonia.
Lois Sasson, 80, American jewelry designer and gay rights activist, complications from COVID-19.
Alexander Spirin, 89, Russian biochemist.
Victor Stacey, 76, Irish Church of Ireland clergyman, dean of St Patrick's Cathedral, Dublin (2012–2016).
Gennady Strakhov, 76, Russian freestyle wrestler, Olympic silver medalist (1972), COVID-19.
Anton Strout, 50, American author and podcaster.
Dawn Wells, 82, American actress (Gilligan's Island, The Town That Dreaded Sundown, Return to Boggy Creek), COVID-19.
Richard Gilbert West, 94, British botanist and geologist.
Eugene Wright, 97, American jazz bassist (The Dave Brubeck Quartet).

31
Constantin Bosânceanu, 54, Romanian footballer (Bucovina Suceava, Oțelul Galați, Rocar București).
Jeremy Burnham, 89, British television actor and screenwriter.
Ralph C. Capparelli, 96, American politician, member of the Illinois House of Representatives (1971–2004).
John Cardos, 91, American film director (Kingdom of the Spiders, Outlaw of Gor, The Day Time Ended) and actor.
Maxine Cheshire, 90, American journalist (The Washington Post), cardiovascular disease.
Tommy Docherty, 92, Scottish football player (Preston North End) and manager (Chelsea, national team).
Paul Etiang, 82, Ugandan politician, deputy prime minister (1996–1999), COVID-19.
Jolanta Fedak, 60, Polish politician, minister of family, labour and social policy (2007–2011) and member of the Sejm (since 2019).
Ernesto Gismondi, 89, Italian designer, founder of Artemide.
Robert Hossein, 93, French film director (Les Misérables, Cemetery Without Crosses), actor (Angélique, Marquise des Anges) and writer, COVID-19.
Dušan Jovanović, 81, Serbian-born Slovene theatre director, playwright, and essayist.
Richard Maxwell Kenan, 80, American politician.
Michael Kindo, 73, Indian field hockey player, Olympic bronze medallist (1972).
Gary Howard Klar, 73, American actor (Day of the Dead, Married to the Mob, Cadillac Man).
Emília Kováčová, 89, Slovak economist and academic, first lady (1993–1998).
Narendra Kumar, 87, Indian military officer and mountaineer.
Maureen Lee, 88, British author.
Olli Lehto, 95, Finnish mathematician.
Marian Leszczyński, 84, Polish Olympic rower (1964).
Inke Maris, 72, Indonesian journalist.
Muladi, 77, Indonesian jurist and politician, justice of the Supreme Court (2000–2001), minister of justice (1998–1999), MP (1997–1998), COVID-19.
Joe Neal, 85, American politician, member of the Nevada Senate (1972–2004).
Olivier Royant, 58, French journalist, director of Paris Match (since 2006).
Johnny Sands, 87, Canadian Olympic speed skater (1956, 1960).
Joan Micklin Silver, 85, American film director (Hester Street, Crossing Delancey, Between the Lines), vascular dementia.
Dick Thornburgh, 88, American lawyer and politician, U.S. Attorney General (1988–1991) and governor of Pennsylvania (1979–1987). 
Narsing Yadav, 57, Indian actor (Kshana Kshanam, Gaayam, Shankar Dada M.B.B.S.), kidney disease.

References

2020-12
 12